Magnolia Cemetery is a cemetery in the Northeast part of DeFuniak Springs, Florida and is located at 222 North Park Street next to Pat Covell Park #2.

Notable interments
Sidney Catts (1863—1936), the 22nd Governor of Florida, one of only two members of the Prohibition Party to ever hold a major office

References

Cemeteries in Florida
Walton County, Florida